Bhale Raja is a 1969 Indian Kannada-language film, directed by Y. R. Swamy and produced by Yajaman Mothi Veeranna. The film stars Rajkumar, Ranga, Nagappa and Eshwarappa. The film had musical score by Chellapilla Satyam.

Cast

Rajkumar as Shivaraj
Ranga
Nagappa
Eshwarappa
Mahadevappa
Narayan
Jayanthi
B. V. Radha
Jayashree
Jaikumari
Baby Sunitha
Baby Padmashree
Master Prabhakar as young Shivaraj
K. S. Ashwath in Guest Appearance
M. P. Shankar in Guest Appearance

Soundtrack

References

External links
 
 

1969 films
1960s Kannada-language films
Films scored by Satyam (composer)
Films directed by Y. R. Swamy